Kovil Esanai may refer to:

 Kovil Esanai (East), a village in Tamil Nadu, India
 Kovil Esanai (West), a village in Tamil Nadu, India